Henry Newman (13 March 1907 – 23 April 1988) was an Australian cricketer. He played three first-class matches for Western Australia between 1927/28 and 1931/32.

See also
 List of Western Australia first-class cricketers

References

External links
 

1907 births
1988 deaths
Australian cricketers
Western Australia cricketers